KELY (1230 AM) is a commercial radio station broadcasting a talk radio format. Licensed to Ely, Nevada, United States, the station is owned and operated by Ely Radio, LLC and features programming from the Genesis Communications Network and the USA Radio Network. It is known as the flagship station for the nationally syndicated Classic Radio Theater with Wyatt Cox. KELY's programming is simulcast on three other radio stations across the state of Nevada including a co-owned station in Reno. On February 7, 2022, Nevada Talk Network launched a translator in Ely, NV on 98.5 MHz FM with the callsign K253CJ.

References

External links

ELY
News and talk radio stations in the United States